The Belfast Sabres (Officially the Belfast Down East Auto Parts Sabres) are a Canadian Junior C ice hockey team located in Belfast, Prince Edward Island. They play out of the Belfast Recreation Centre, and are coached by Devan Gunn. They are members of the Prince Edward Island Junior C Hockey League.

Team history

Unlike the average expansion franchise, the Sabres became a force in the PEIJCHL after only a few years in the league. They finished second in the league in both their second and third seasons, behind only South Side.

By their third season the Sabres had advanced to their first league playoff finals only to lose to the South Side.

Season by season

See also

 List of ice hockey teams in Prince Edward Island

References

External links
 PEI Junior C Hockey League home page
 Belfast Sabres home

Ice hockey teams in Prince Edward Island
2012 establishments in Prince Edward Island
Ice hockey clubs established in 2012